Barbara von Annenkoff (13 February 1900 – 30 November 1979) was a Russian-born German stage and film actress.

Selected filmography
 Op Hoop van Zegen (1924)
 Wood Love (1925)
 Den of Iniquity (1925)
 One Minute to Twelve (1925)
 Derby (1926)
 My Friend the Chauffeur (1926)
 Bismarck 1862–1898 (1927)
 The Awakening of Woman (1927)
 Prince or Clown (1928)
 Madame Bovary (1937)

References

Bibliography

External links

1900 births
1979 deaths
German film actresses
German silent film actresses
20th-century German actresses
German stage actresses
Emigrants from the Russian Empire to Germany